Charencey may refer to: 

Charencey, Côte-d'Or, a commune in the Côte-d'Or department, France
Charencey, Orne, a commune in the Orne department, France